Karl Rabus (Russian: Карл Иванович Рабус (11 May 1800, St. Petersburg - 14 January 1857, Moscow) was a Russian architectural painter and art teacher.

Biography
His father died when Karl was seven. At the age of only ten, he was sent to study at the Imperial Academy of Arts; remaining there until 1821, when he received a small gold medal and a second-degree certificate.

Crimea became one of his favorite places to paint. There, he created the works necessary for him to obtain the title of "Academician" by painting landmarks in a manner that would later become known as en plein aire. He was awarded the title in 1827 for his canvas depicting a villa in Gurzuf, built by the Duc de Richelieu. He also received praise for his view of Balaklava. From Crimea, he went to Odessa, then spent some time in Istanbul.

He also taught a few classes in the theory of colors and art history. Sometimes, he would offer financial support to his most promising students.

In his later years, he tried his hand at writing; producing "A Guide to Perspective" and beginning a history of art. He also provided commentary on art for several magazines and newspapers. During those years, he taught landscape painting at the Stroganov School and the Moscow School of Painting, Sculpture and Architecture.

Toward the end of his life, he suffered from a type of color blindness (possibly due to glaucoma), that left him unable to distinguish orange and yellow shades. He died after an unspecified long and serious illness.

Selected paintings

References

Further reading
 
 Brief biography @ Русская живопись (Artsait)

External links 

1800 births
1857 deaths
Russian painters
Court painters
Cityscape artists
Imperial Academy of Arts alumni
Artists from Saint Petersburg
Academic staff of the Moscow School of Painting, Sculpture and Architecture
Academic staff of Stroganov Moscow State Academy of Arts and Industry